The Bar massacre was the killings of an unknown number of mostly ethnic Albanians  from Kosovo  Yugoslav Partisans in late March or early April 1945 in Bar, a municipality in Montenegro, at the end of World War II.

Massacre 

By 1942, the city of Bar became a home of many Serbs and Montenegrins and other refugees who were forced to flee from Kosovo and to escape the violence done by Albanian units. Many of these joined the Partisan forces and participated in their activities at Bar.

The victims were Albanian recruits from Kosovo, who had been pressed by the Yugoslav Partisans into service. These men were then assembled in Prizren and marched on foot in three columns to Bar where they were supposed to receive short training and then sent off to the front. The march took the rugged mountain ranges of Kosovo and Montenegro to reach its destination. Upon arrival locals reported that these men, who had marched a considerable distance, were "exhausted" and "distressed". The column of men which stretched a few kilometres were then gathered on the Barkso Polje. At one point, in Polje, one of the Albanians from the column attacked and killed one of the Yugoslav officers, Boža Dabanovića. Very soon after that somebody from the column threw a smuggled bomb at the commander of the brigade. This created a panic among the Partisans. The guards watching over the recruits then fired into the crowd killing many and prompting the survivors to flee into the surrounding mountains. In another case, several hundred Albanians were herded into a tunnel, near Bar, which was subsequently sealed off so that all of those trapped within the tunnel were asphyxiated. 

Yugoslav sources put the number of victims at 400 while Albanian sources put the figure at 2,000 killed in Bar alone. According to Croatian historian Ljubica Štefan, the Partisans killed 1,600 Albanians in Bar on 1 April after an incident at a fountain. There are also accounts claiming that the victims included young boys. Other sources cited that the killing started en route for no apparent reason and this was supported by the testimony of Zoi Themeli in his 1949 trial. Themeli was a collaborator who worked as an important official of the Sigurimi, the Albanian secret police. After the massacre, the site was  immediately covered in concrete by the Yugoslav communist regime and built an airport on top of the mass grave.

Notes

References

Massacres in Yugoslavia
1945 in Montenegro
Mass murder in 1945
1945 in Yugoslavia
Massacres in 1945
Yugoslavia in World War II
Bar, Montenegro
Anti-Albanian sentiment
Kosovo Albanians
March 1945 events in Europe
Yugoslav Partisan war crimes in World War II
World War II massacres